Hyalonematidae is a family of sponges belonging to the order Amphidiscosida.

Genera:
 Chalaronema Ijima, 1927
 Composocalyx Schulze, 1904
 Compsocalyx Schulze, 1904
 Hyalonema Gray, 1832
 Lophophysema Schulze, 1900
 Tabachnickia Özdikmen, 2010

References

Sponges